Rashid Abbasi may refer to:
 Qaleh Rashid Aqa
 Rashid Abbas
 Prince Saeed Rashid Abbasi